Quintus Servilius Caepio may refer to:

 Quintus Servilius Caepio (consul 140 BC)
 Quintus Servilius Caepio (consul 106 BC)
 Quintus Servilius Caepio (quaestor 103 BC)
 Quintus Servilius Caepio (adoptive father of Brutus)
 Quintus Servilius Caepio Brutus, another name of Marcus Junius Brutus, the assassin of Julius Caesar